Murcia–San Javier Airport  is a military air base and former civilian passenger airport located in San Javier,  southeast of Murcia, Spain. It is owned by the Spanish Air and Space Force. It was replaced (after several delays) by the new Región de Murcia International Airport, when it opened on 15 January 2019.

Overview

Operations
The airport can handle aircraft up to the size of a Boeing 757. It has Category 5 fire cover by the IATA, and also has one ambulance available.

The military air base dates back to at least the early 1930s and is located at the northern end of the airport. It is used chiefly by Spanish Air and Space Force turboprop, piston and jet-engined training aircraft of the Academia General del Aire (the Spanish Air Force College), including the aerobatic demonstration team of the Spanish Air and Space Force Patrulla Águila which can often be seen practicing over the nearby Mar Menor.

In recent years, Murcia Airport became much busier thanks to the arrival of several low-cost airlines. According to Aena, passenger numbers jumped from 88,608 in 1995 to 1,181,490 passengers in 2012.

Replacement
The airport invested in a new €60 million runway and terminal buildings around 2004 to 2011  In November 2011, the Minister of Public Works Antonio Sevilla, and Secretary of State for Transport Isaías Táboas, signed an official agreement that effectively proposed to close the airport to civilian air traffic from 2012.

In November 2017, the Spanish government said it would be awarding AENA the contract of managing Corvera Airport - whereby San Javier would be closed and flights transferred. In April 2018, it was confirmed that the new Región de Murcia International Airport, which is situated in closer proximity to the city of Murcia, would open in January 2019. San Javier closed on 14 January 2019 and all airlines transferred their services to the new airport the following day. The final flight to operate at San Javier was Ryanair flight FR4117 to Manchester.

Airlines and destinations
All operations transferred to Región de Murcia International Airport on 14 January 2019. Prior to this it was mostly used by leisure and low-cost carriers such as Jet2.com and Ryanair.

Statistics

References

External links

Defunct airports in Spain
Airports in the Region of Murcia
San Javier, Murcia
Airports disestablished in 2018